Muriel Emma Bell  (4 January 1898 – 2 May 1974) was a New Zealand nutritionist and medical researcher.

Early life
Bell was born in Murchison, New Zealand on 4 January 1898, the daughter of Thomas, a farmer, and Eliza. Bell attended the local school in Murchison. In 1907, her mother was killed, and her father injured, in a tramcar accident in Wellington and her father consequently had to give up farming. He moved the family to Nelson and later became Mayor of Richmond.

Education
Bell's father remarried in 1909, and Jessie McNee became Bell's stepmother. She encouraged Bell in her education, and Bell studied first at Nelson Girls' Central School and then Nelson College for Girls, where she became Head Girl. 
In 1916 Bell won a Junior Scholarship to Victoria University of Wellington and began a B.A. degree. In 1917 she transferred to Otago Medical School. In 1926, she was the first woman to be awarded an MD degree (Doctor of Medicine) by the University of Otago. Bell's thesis was on basal metabolism in goitre and contributed to the introduction of iodised salt, as her research showed that increasing the level of iodine in the diet was an effective protection against the illness

Career
In 1922, Bell was appointed Assistant Lecturer in Physiology, and the following year became a lecturer in Physiology, at Otago Medical School.

In 1929, Bell received the William Gibson Research Scholarship for Medical Women of the British Empire, which enabled her to study bush sickness in sheep with the newly formed DSIR (Department of Scientific and Industrial Research). She also became interested in soil deficiencies at this time. From 1930 to 1932 she researched vitamins at University College London and then stayed in England to work as a pathologist, including at Elizabeth Garrett Anderson Hospital.

In 1935, Bell returned to Dunedin and took a position lecturing physiology and experimental pharmacology at Otago Medical School. Two years later she became a founding member of the Medical Research Council, and served on its Nutrition Committee as both Research Officer and chairperson. She also served on the Board of Health, where she was the only woman board member.

In 1940, Bell was appointed the first Nutrition Officer in the Department of Health and held this position until retiring in 1964. She also held the position of Director of Nutrition Research at Otago Medical School for the same period of time. In these roles, she both conducted research and found effective ways to communicate the results to the public, such as through magazine and newspaper articles, radio broadcasts and the Plunket Society. During  World War II she advised the New Zealand Red Cross on the vitamin value of food parcels sent to soldiers serving abroad, and immediately after the war she was responsible for writing guidelines and scales for food rationing. She also researched the vitamin content of New Zealand-grown vegetables, fruit, fish and cereals, and encouraged New Zealanders to eat more fruit and vegetables.

An early project for Bell was to supervise the joint publication of a textbook on nutrition by the Otago Medical School, the Department of Health and the Medical Research Council. The publication, "Good Nutrition: Principles and Menus" was a huge success and 40,000 copies were produced for nurses, doctors and the general public.

A particularly important goal for Bell was to ensure a safe and affordable supply of milk, and to encourage New Zealanders to drink milk as part of their daily diet. She was a founding member of the Central Milk Council, a watchdog body formed in 1945 to address problems in the industry which had been revealed in an inquiry the previous year. While on the council she worked to have millk pasteurized, delivered in covered trucks to protect it from sunlight, and to have unhealthy cows destroyed. With Dr Helen Deem of the Plunket Society she revised the guidelines for bottle-fed babies.

Another area of interest for Bell was the increase in dental caries. In 1950, Bell and her friend Dr Lucy Wills spend eight weeks in Fiji and Samoa to investigate nutritional reasons for tooth decay in the local populations there. Two years later she spent a sabbatical at Harvard University where she researched the effects of fluoridated water. As a result of her research, she returned to New Zealand to campaign for fluoridation. She was successful and from 1958 was a member of the Fluoridation Committee of the Department of Health.

After her retirement in 1964, Bell continued to take an interest in nutritional studies. She remained active on the Milk Council until her death, and when she died on 2 May 1974, she had been working on an article on the karaka berry.

Personal life
Bell was married twice: first to James Saunders, from 1928 to his death in 1940; and secondly to Alfred Hefford, from 1942 to his death in 1957.

Recognition
 1938–1940 – Vice-president of the Dunedin Branch of the New Zealand Medical Women's Association
 1940–1945 – President of the Dunedin Branch of the New Zealand Medical Women's Association
 1941 – a Fellow of the New Zealand Institute of Chemistry
 1952 – a Fellow of the Royal Society of New Zealand
 1959 – a Fellow of the Royal Society of Medicine
 1959 – a Fellow of the Royal Australasian College of Physicians
 1959 – awarded Commander of the Order of the British Empire
 1966 – honorary member of the New Zealand Nutrition Society
 1968 – awarded an honorary doctorate by the University of Otago
The Nutrition Society of New Zealand holds an annual Muriel Bell Memorial Lecture.

Legacy
In 2017, she was selected as one of the Royal Society of New Zealand's "150 women in 150 words".

References

Further reading 
 Brown, Diana. 2018. The Unconventional Career of Dr Muriel Bell. Dunedin: Otago University Press.

External links
 Photo of Dr Bell at work at the Otago Medical School in 1949

1898 births
1974 deaths
New Zealand medical researchers
People educated at Nelson College for Girls
People from Murchison, New Zealand
University of Otago alumni
Academic staff of the University of Otago
New Zealand Commanders of the Order of the British Empire
20th-century New Zealand medical doctors
New Zealand women medical doctors
20th-century women physicians